Agathiceras applanatum is a species of Agathiceras, named by Teichert in 1944.

The mollusc was a fast moving nektonic carnivore and had an average shell width of 8.5 mm and shell diameter of 18.8 mm.

References

Agathiceratidae
Fossil taxa described in 1944